Each "article" in this category is a collection of entries about several stamp issuers, presented in alphabetical order. The entries are formulated on the micro model and so provide summary information about all known issuers.  

See the :Category:Compendium of postage stamp issuers page for details of the project.

Icaria 

Refer 	Ikaria

ICC 

Refer 	Indochina (Indian Forces)

Iceland 

Dates 	1873 –
Capital 	Reykjavík
Currency 	(1873) 96 skilling = 1 riksdaler
		(1876) 100 aurer = 1 krona

Idar 

Dates 	1939 – 1950
Currency 	12 pies = 1 anna; 16 annas = 1 rupee

Refer 	Indian Native States

IEF 

Refer 	Indian Expeditionary Forces (IEF)

Ifni 

Dates 	1941 – 1969
Capital 	Sidi Ifni
Currency 	100 centimos = 1 peseta

Refer 	Spanish West Africa

Ikaria 

Dates 	1912 – 1913
Capital 	Agios Kirykos (Ayios Kirikos)
Currency 	100 lepta = 1 drachma

Main Article Needed 

See also 	Greek Occupation Issues

Ile Rouad 

Dates 	1916 – 1921
Capital 	
Currency 	100 centimes = 1 piastre

Refer 	Alaouites

Ili Republic 

Refer 	Sinkiang

Imperial Japanese Government 

Refer 	Brunei (Japanese Occupation)

Inde 

Refer 	French Indian Settlements

India 

Dates 	1852 –
Capital 	Delhi
Currency 	(1852) 12 pies = 1 anna; 16 annas = 1 rupee
		(1957) 100 naye paise = 1 rupee
		(1964) 100 paisa = 1 rupee

See also 	East India

Indian Convention States 

Includes 	Chamba;
		Faridkot;
		Gwalior;
		Jind;
		Nabha;
		Patiala

Indian Expeditionary Forces (IEF) 

Dates 	1914 – 1922
Currency 	12 pies = 1 anna; 16 annas = 1 rupee

Refer 	Indian Overseas Forces

Indian Feudatory States 

Refer 	Indian Native States

Indian Native States 

Includes 	Alwar;
		Bamra;
		Barwani;
		Bhopal;
		Bhor;
		Bijawar;
		Bundi;
		Bussahir;
		Charkari;
		Cochin;
		Dhar;
		Dungarpur;
		Duttia;
		Hyderabad;
		Idar;
		Indore;
		Jaipur;
		Jammu & Kashmir;
		Jasdan;
		Jhalawar;
		Kishangarh;
		Las Bela;
		Morvi;
		Nandgaon;
		Nawanager;
		Orchha;
		Poonch;
		Rajasthan;
		Rajpipla;
		Scinde;
		Shahpura;
		Sirmoor;
		Soruth (Saurashtra);
		Travancore;
		Travancore-Cochin;
		Wadhwan

See also 	Indian Convention States

Indian Overseas Forces 

Main Article Needed 

Includes 	China Expeditionary Force;
		Congo (Indian UN Force);
		Gaza (Indian UN Force);
		Indian Expeditionary Forces (IEF);
		Indochina (Indian Forces);
		Korea (Indian Custodian Forces);
		Mosul (Indian Forces)

Indochina 

Dates 	1889 – 1949
Capital 	Saigon
Currency 	(1889) 100 centimes = 1 franc
		(1918) 100 cents = 1 piastre
Main Article
Postage stamps and postal history of Indochina

Indochina Territories
Main Article
Postage stamps and postal history of the Indochina Territories
Includes
Annam (Indochina);
Cambodia (Indochina)
See also
Annam & Tongking;
Cochin-China

Indochina (Indian Forces) 

Dates 	1954 – 1968
Currency 	(1954) 12 pies = 1 anna; 16 annas = 1 rupee
		(1957) 100 naye paise = 1 rupee
		(1964) 100 paisa = 1 rupee

Refer 	Indian Overseas Forces

Indochinese Post Offices Abroad 

Refer 	China (Indochinese Post Offices)

Indonesia 

Dates 	1945 –
Capital 	Djakarta
Currency 	(1945) 100 cents = 1 gulden or 100 sen = 1 rupiah
		(1950) 100 sen = 1 rupiah

Main Article  Postage stamps and postal history of Indonesia

See also 	Riau-Lingga Archipelago

Indore 

Dates 	1886 – 1950
Currency 	12 pies = 1 anna; 16 annas = 1 rupee

Refer 	Indian Native States

Ingermanland 

Refer 	North Ingermanland

Inhambane 

Dates 	1895 – 1920
Capital 	Inhambane
Currency 	(1895) 1000 reis = 1 milreis
		(1912) 100 centavos = 1 escudo

Refer 	Mozambique Territories

Inini 

Dates 	1932 – 1946
Capital 	Camopi
Currency 	100 centimes = 1 franc

Refer 	French Guiana

Inner Mongolia 

Refer 	Mengkiang (Japanese Occupation)

International Commission in Indochina (ICC) 

Refer 	Indochina (Indian Forces)

International Court of Justice (The Hague) 

Dates 	1934 – 1958
Currency 	100 cents = 1 gulden

Refer 	International Organisations

International Education Office 

Dates 	1944 – 1960
Currency 	100 cents = 1 franc

Refer 	International Organisations

International Labour Office 

Dates 	1923 – 1960
Currency 	100 cents = 1 franc

Refer 	International Organisations

International Organisations 

Main Article Needed 

Includes 	Council of Europe (Strasbourg);
		International Court of Justice (The Hague);
		International Education Office;
		International Labour Office;
		International Refugees Organisation;
		International Telecommunication Union;
		League of Nations (Geneva);
		UNESCO;
		United Nations (UN);
		Universal Postal Union (UPU);
		World Health Organisation;
		World Intellectual Property Organisation;
		World Meteorological Organisation

International Refugees Organisation 

Dates 	1950 only
Currency 	100 cents = 1 franc

Refer 	International Organisations

International Telecommunication Union 

Dates 	1958 – 1960
Currency 	100 cents = 1 franc

Refer 	International Organisations

References

Bibliography
 Stanley Gibbons Ltd, Europe and Colonies 1970, Stanley Gibbons Ltd, 1969
 Stanley Gibbons Ltd, various catalogues
 Stuart Rossiter & John Flower, The Stamp Atlas, W H Smith, 1989
 XLCR Stamp Finder and Collector's Dictionary, Thomas Cliffe Ltd, c.1960

External links
 AskPhil – Glossary of Stamp Collecting Terms
 Encyclopaedia of Postal History

Icaria